The Bear River dikes are a 1,265 to 1,269 million year old group of dikes in northern Yukon, Canada. They represent a feature related to magmatism of the extensive Mackenzie Large Igneous Province and are considered to be the western extension of the northwest–southeast trending Mackenzie dike swarm.

References

Mackenzie Large Igneous Province
Igneous petrology of Yukon
Mesoproterozoic magmatism